MCEF or Major Cdk9-interacting elongation factor is a transcription factor related to Af4.  It is the fourth member of the Af4 family (AFF) of transcription factors, involved in numerous pathologies, including Acute Lymphoblastic Leukemia (ALL), abnormal CNS development, breast cancer and azoospermia.

Because it apparently interacts with the species-specific human co-factor (P-TEFb) for HIV-1 transcription, and because it can repress HIV-1 replication, MCEF (also known as AFF4 or AF5q31) may have future therapeutic uses.

MCEF was originally cloned and named by Mario Clemente Estable of Ryerson University, while he was a post-doctoral fellow in the laboratory of Robert G. Roeder, at the Rockefeller University.

See also
Transcription factors

References

 

Transcription factors
Oncogenes